Siberian chiffchaff (Phylloscopus collybita tristis) is a leaf-warbler which is usually considered a subspecies of the common chiffchaff, but may be a species in its own right.

Range

Siberian chiffchaff breeds in Siberia east of the Pechora River and winters in the lower Himalayas.

Status in Europe and North America

It is also regularly recorded in western Europe in winter, and it is likely that the numbers involved have been underestimated due to uncertainties over identification criteria, lack of good data and recording policies (Sweden and Finland only accept trapped birds).

Because of their unfamiliar appearance, British records in the 1950s and 1960s were originally thought to be greenish warblers, and accepted as such by BBRC, the national rarities committee, until the records were reviewed in the 1980s.

A Gambell, AK bird discovered by Alexander Lin-Moore and Ethan Goodman on June 5, 2015 and seen by many birders would be the 4th (or 5th?) reported in North America.

Appearance and vocalisations

It is a dull bird, grey or brownish above and whitish below, with little yellow in the plumage, and the buff-white supercilium is often longer than in the western subspecies. It has  a higher pitched suitsistsuisit song and a short high-pitched cheet call. It is sometimes considered to be a full species due to its distinctive plumage and vocalisations, being similar to P. s. sindianus in these respects.

Taxonomy

Common chiffchaffs (of the nominate race) and Siberian chiffchaffs do not recognize each other's songs. Pending resolution of the status of the form fulvescens, which is found where the ranges of common chiffchaff (of the race abietinus) and Siberian chiffchaff connect and may or may not be a hybrid between these, tristis is maintained in P. collybita by most checklists.

Resources

Further reading
 
 
 
 
 
 
 
 
 
 Ebels, Enno (2009) "Siberische Tjiftjaffen in Nederland: voorkomen en determinatie" Dutch Birding 31(2): 86-100 (in Dutch with English summary)
 
 
 

Phylloscopus
Subspecies